Football at the 1934 Far Eastern Games, held in Manila, Philippines was won by China while no other medals were awarded for second or third place.

Teams

Results

Winner

Statistics

Goalscorers

References

External links
Stokkermans, Karel. "Tenth Far Eastern Games 1934 (Manila)". RSSSF. Retrieved 2010-07-03.
Industrial and Commercial Daily Press, 1934-05-12, section 1 page 3 (total page no. 3)

1934 in Philippine sport
Football at the Far Eastern Championship Games
International association football competitions hosted by the Philippines
1934 in Asian football